Bootlegger's Brewery is a craft beer brewery based in Fullerton, California, and is one of the largest breweries in Orange County, California.

Brewery
Bootlegger's was founded in 2008 in Fullerton with a combined tasting room and brewery. In 2012, Bootlegger's moved its production to a new, larger brewing facility, also in Fullerton. Aaron Barkenhagen has stated plans to quadruple production with the new facility. , Bootlegger's Brewery's tasting room remains at the original location while the brewery develops a new tasting room in Downtown Fullerton.

Beers

Year-round beers
Old World Hefeweizen – 5.0% ABV, 8.1 IBU - German Style Unfiltered Wheat Ale
Palomino Pale Ale – 5.5% ABV, 19.5 IBU -Classic American Pale Ale
Rustic Rye IPA – 6.2% ABV, 90.9 IBU - Rye India Pale Ale
Black Phoenix – 6.7% ABV, 39.8 IBU - Chipotle Coffee Stout
Golden Chaos - 8.5% ABV, 27.5 IBU - Belgian Style Golden Ale

Collaborations
Holiday Strong Ale with Pizza Port and Newport Beach Brewing Company 
Chocosaurus Rye with The Bruery

References

External links
 

Companies based in Orange County, California
Food and drink companies established in 2008
Beer brewing companies based in Orange County, California
Companies based in Fullerton, California